Emmanuel Georges (Emanuel Georgev) is a former U.S. soccer defender.

National team
Georges earned three caps with the U.S. national team in 1973. All three games took place over a seven-day period in August 1973. The first was a 1-0 loss to Poland. While he started the game, he came off for Bob O'Leary at halftime.  He then played the full game in a 2-0 win over Canada two days later. That was followed by his third and final national team game, a 4-0 loss to Poland on August 10, 1973. He again started the game, but was replaced by Archie Roboostoff at halftime.

References

United States men's international soccer players
American Soccer League (1933–1983) players
Living people
Association football defenders
American soccer players
Year of birth missing (living people)